Talkeetna (Dena'ina: K'dalkitnu) is a census-designated place (CDP) in Matanuska-Susitna Borough, Alaska, United States. At the 2020 census the population was 1,055, up from 876 in 2010.

Geography

Talkeetna is located at the confluence of three rivers, the Susitna, Chulitna and Talkeetna. Talkeetna began in 1916 when the area was chosen as a district headquarters for the Alaska Railroad. A post office opened as well as a sawmill, trading post, cigar and donkey store and other businesses as well as many cabins. In 1917, the residents encouraged the government to survey the lots on which their homes stood. In 1919, the railroad surveyed and auctioned eighty lots, 41 of which already had permanent structures on them. The average price at the sale was $14.25.

Flightseeing, rafting, mountain biking, hiking, camping, fishing and hunting make up a large portion of the local economy. Talkeetna is a 2½-hour drive from Anchorage, the largest city in Alaska. The core downtown area (Talkeetna Historic District) is on the register of National Historic Places, with buildings dating from the early 1900s including Nagley's General Store, Fairview Inn and the Talkeetna Roadhouse.

Climate
The climate is continental subarctic (Köppen: Dfc), assuming some characteristics like warm-summer but the shorter duration of the hot season and long winters give the town boreal features and in terms of vegetation is composed of taiga (Cook Inlet Basin), different from the southcentral coastal more diversified. Even though the cold, dry air comes from the north, the moisture acquired comes from the Gulf of Alaska. That is, summers are between a short duration and an average duration. It is lighter than Yellowknife, Canada at similar latitudes due to the moderating effect of the Pacific Ocean and the adiabatic warming of the descending air from the surrounding mountains. The average annual temperature is 0.8 °C, the average precipitation is not as high but relatively well distributed during the year, about 686 mm on average.
Notes

Demographics

Talkeetna first appeared on the 1920 U.S. Census as an unincorporated village. It was made a census-designated place (CDP) in 1980.

The 2020 population was 1,055. As of the census of 2000, there were 772 people, 358 households, and 181 families residing in the CDP. The population density was 18.6 people per square mile (7.2/km2). There were 528 housing units at an average density of 12.7 per square mile (4.9/km2). The racial makeup of the CDP was 87.95% White, 3.76% Native American, 0.13% Asian, 1.30% from African American, and 6.87% from two or more races. 1.04% of the population were Hispanic or Latino of any race.

There were 358 households, out of which 28.2% had children under the age of 18 living with them, 38.0% were married couples living together, 7.3% had a female householder with no husband present, and 49.4% were non-families. Thirty-eight percent of all households were made up of individuals, and 6.7% had someone living alone who was 65 years of age or older. The average household size was 2.16 and the average family size was 2.92.

In the CDP, the population was spread out, with 23.3% under the age of 18, 5.8% from 18 to 24, 35.4% from 25 to 44, 29.4% from 45 to 64, and 6.1% who were 65 years of age or older. The median age was 39 years. For every 100 females, there were 113.3 males. For every 100 females age 18 and over, there were 114.5 males.

The median income for a household in the CDP was $38,289, and the median income for a family was $46,818. Males had a median income of $34,732 versus $26,250 for females. The per capita income for the CDP was $23,695. About 7.2% of families and 10.8% of the population were below the poverty line, including 8.8% of those under age 18 and none of those age 65 or over.

Economy

Talkeetna is the base for expeditions to Denali (also known as Mount McKinley). The Denali National Park's Walter Harper Talkeetna Ranger Station is located in Talkeetna. Tourists travel to Talkeetna each summer to fish salmon, raft and go flightseeing. Products by local artists, musicians and craftspeople are available in area stores.

Susitna Dam

The Susitna Dam is a proposed hydroelectricity plan from the State of Alaska. On July 25, 2011, the Governor of Alaska signed a bill to construct the dam on the glacier-fed Susitna River. The dam, if built to its full design height, would become the fifth-tallest of the nearly 850,000 dams on Earth.

Soon after the dam's construction was announced, the Coalition for Susitna Dam Alternatives was formed to fight its construction. It is their argument that recreation, nature and the town would be severely threatened by the dam, and have compared it to the Three Gorges Dam in China.

Events

Every March, the Oosik Classic Ski Race is organized by the Denali Nordic Ski Club. Distances are approximate and trail conditions are variable.

The Moose Dropping Festival, a two-day celebration held each July, came to an end with the announcement on August 21, 2009, by the Talkeetna Historical Society that the festival has been canceled. The event was named after a lottery where participants bet on numbered, varnished pieces of moose feces, or "moose droppings" dropped from a helicopter onto a target. A softball tournament historically has been held on the same weekend as the Moose Dropping Festival but is not part of the festival itself. Other events that typically held on Moose Dropping Festival weekend included a five-kilometre walk-run—also not a part of the official festival, a Mountain Mother contest, and a parade. The festival went under scrutiny from PETA, and they began a campaign against it after a misinterpretation led them to believe that the festival involved moose being dropped out of helicopters. This took several heated letters and hours of phone conversations to clear up with PETA and make them recognize that moose droppings were being dropped from helicopters, rather than the actual animal.

In December, the Wilderness Woman and Bachelor Auction & Ball takes place.

Talkeetna's largest celebration of the winter, called Winterfest, takes place during the entire month of December, and features a motorized Parade of Lights, a lighted tree in the Village Park, a Taste of Talkeetna, and numerous special events hosted by local businesses and special events at Talkeetna Public Library.

Government
Since Talkeetna is only a census-designated place, it is unincorporated.  Talkeetna has a Community Council and its mayor was a cat named Stubbs from 1997 until his death in 2017. It is located in Matanuska-Susitna Borough's District 7, which is represented by Assembly Member Vern Halter, who succeeded borough mayor Larry DeVilbiss.

A popular rumor states Stubbs was elected following a successful write-in campaign by voters who opposed the human candidates. However, according to NPR, the cat could not have been elected as a write-in candidate because "The tiny town has no real mayor, so there was no election." Stubbs' position is honorary as the town is unincorporated. On August 31, 2013, Stubbs was attacked and mauled by a dog while roaming the streets and after treatment at the local veterinarian returned home on September 9. Stubbs died on July 21, 2017, at the age of 20 years and 3 months.

Legislative representation

Representation in the Alaska Senate
 District E (1959–1967) – two-member, at-large district for the Third Division, which consisted of nearly all of Southcentral Alaska and most of Southwest Alaska
 Ralph E. Moody, D-Anchorage (1959–1960;  resigned to accept appointment as attorney general, seat left unfilled until start of next legislature)
 Irene E. Ryan, D-Anchorage (1959–1961)
 Vance Phillips, R-Anchorage (1961–1965)
 Howard W. Pollock, R-Anchorage (1961–1963, 1965–1967)
 Nicholas J. Begich, D-Fort Richardson and Spenard (1963–1967)
 District G (1959–1967) – single-member district which covered an area coterminous with the present-day Municipality of Anchorage and Matanuska-Susitna Borough
 J. Earl Cooper, D-Anchorage (1959;  resigned to accept appointment to judgeship)
 Seaborn J. Buckalew, Jr., D-Anchorage (1960–1961;  appointed to replace Cooper)
 Brad Phillips, R-Anchorage (1961–1967)
The area-based apportionment scheme, established in the Alaska Constitution, was abolished following the decision of the U.S. Supreme Court in Reynolds v. Sims, affirmed by the Alaska Supreme Court in its decision in Nolan v. Wade.  Both houses of the legislature were apportioned based strictly on population from this point forward.
 District D (1967–1983)
 Jan M. Koslosky, R-Palmer (1967–1973)
 Jalmar M. Kerttula, D-Palmer (1973–1983)
 District I (1983–1985) – represented by Jalmar M. Kerttula throughout its existence
 District E (1985–1993) – the previous District I, coterminous with both the MSB and the two-member House District 16, was changed due to further redistricting ordered through the decision in Carpenter v. Hammond.  The new district was a two-member district, with designated seats A and B, and combined the MSB with portions of Anchorage and the Kenai Peninsula Borough.  This "donut district", which encircled most of Anchorage, was ruled improper in a later court case, No further redistricting was ordered, however, due to the fact that this decision was reached approximately 2 years before the start of the next redistricting cycle.
 District E, Seat A
 Jalmar M. Kerttula (1985–1993)
 District E, Seat B
 Edna B. DeVries, R-Palmer (1985–1987)
 Mike Szymanski, D-Anchorage (1987–1991)
 Curt Menard, D-Wasilla (1991–1993)
Subsequent redistrictings created 40 House districts and 20 Senate districts.  This was included with the redistricting amendments to the Alaska Constitution ratified by voters in 1998, which means that future redistricting boards are compelled to follow the same scheme.
 District N (1993–2003)
 Jalmar M. Kerttula (1993–1995, lost reelection)
 Lyda Green, R-Wasilla (1995–2003)
 District H (2003–2013)
 Scott Ogan, R-Palmer (2003–2004, resigned)
 Charlie Huggins, R-Wasilla (2004–2013)
 District D (2013–present)
 Mike J. Dunleavy, R-Wasilla (2013-1/15/2018, resigned)
represented by Mike Shower, (R-Wasilla) (2/22/2018- (appointed by Gov. Walker)

Representation in the Alaska House of Representatives
 District 9 (1959–1963)
 James J. Hurley, D-Palmer (1959–1961)
 Jalmar M. Kerttula, D-Palmer (1961–1963)
 District 7 (1963–1973)
 Eugene Reid, R-Palmer (1963–1965)
 Jalmar M. Kerttula (1965–1973)
 District 6 (1973–1983)
 Alfred O. Ose, D-Palmer (1973–1979)
 Patrick J. Carney, D-Wasilla (1979–1983)
 District 16 (1983–1993) – increasing population in the MSB during the 1970s meant that the borough was apportioned two seats.  The scheme in place for this redistricting cycle placed the more densely populated portions of Alaska into two-member districts, with designated seats A and B.
 District 16, Seat A
 Barbara Lacher, R-Wasilla (1983–1985)
 Katie Hurley, D-Wasilla (1985–1987)
 Curt Menard, R (later switched to D)-Wasilla (1987–1991)
 Patrick J. Carney (1991–1993)
 District 16, Seat B – represented by Ronald L. Larson (D-Palmer) throughout its existence
Subsequent redistrictings created 40 House districts and 20 Senate districts.  This was included with the redistricting amendments to the Alaska Constitution ratified by voters in 1998, which means that future redistricting boards are compelled to follow the same scheme.
 District 28 (1993–2003)
 Curt Menard (1993–1995)
 Beverly Masek, R-Willow (1995–2003)
 District 15 (2003–2013)
 Beverly Masek (2003–2005, lost renomination)
 Mark Neuman, R-Big Lake (2005–2013)
 District 7 (2013–present) – represented by Wes Keller (R-Wasilla) since its inception

Education
Talkeetna Elementary School is located near the heart of downtown. Grades K–6 are taught at this location.

A new Susitna Valley Junior-Senior High School opened in January 2010, replacing the one that burned to the ground in June 2007 while repairs were being made to the roof. In the interim, classes were held in portables on the grounds of the Upper Susitna Senior Center. The mascot of Susitna Valley Junior-Senior High School is the Ram.

Media
Talkeetna has a community radio station, 88.9 KTNA, with locally hosted shows and NPR programming. Talkeetna has a local newspaper, the Good Times, which has a distribution of 7,500 year-round and serves the communities of Talkeetna, Trapper Creek, Willow, Houston and Big Lake, with additional distribution along the Parks Highway as far north as Nenana during the summer months. The Good Times is currently published every other week in print. Publishers of the Good Times also publish a local area phone book and an annual visitors’ guide. Another newspaper, The Alaska Pioneer Press, which was under different ownership and was published monthly, ceased publication in January, 2011, after its owners moved out of the area. Whole Wheat Radio, an independent webcast, began broadcast in 2002, which was relatively early, and ceased in 2010.

Transportation
Talkeetna is served by Talkeetna Airport, which is home to several air taxi companies that provide flightseeing trips and support for mountain climbers. Many of the air taxi companies were started to ferry climbers from Talkeetna to Denali, as Talkeetna has the easiest access to the south side of the mountain where the main base camp is located. Legendary bush pilots such as Don Sheldon and Cliff Hudson, both based out of Talkeetna, pioneered glacier flying on Denali (formerly Mount McKinley). Their companies, Talkeetna Air Taxi and Hudson Air Service (now operating as Sheldon Air Service), respectively, are still in operation.

The Talkeetna Airstrip is a restricted use airstrip and on the list of National Historic Places also.

Talkeetna is a stop on the Denali Star, Aurora Winter Train, and Hurricane Turn trains of the Alaska Railroad.

Sunshine Transit Coalition started in March 2009. An educational symposium in 2008 pinpointed transportation as one of the biggest barriers to education and health care. The Coalition's goal was to break down those barriers and make transportation easy and accessible to every resident no matter what their income level. Sunshine Transit, Public Transit for the Upper Susitna Valley runs five days a week along the Talkeetna Spur Road. Future goals include expanding service, and number of vehicles, to Trapper Creek and south on the Parks Highway as well as service in the community of Willow.

In popular culture
The town of Talkeetna was mentioned in Travel Channel's Man v. Food. In season 2 episode 16, the host travels to the Roadhouse, a restaurant in Talkeetna, to sample their unique breakfast dishes. Also featured is West Rib Pub & Cafe.

The town of Cicely from the television series Northern Exposure has been said that it could be patterned after Talkeetna by a journalist, but it has not been confirmed by any cast member. Filming actually took place in Roslyn, Washington.

Talkeetna features heavily in Railroad Alaska on Discovery Channel. The show has three seasons and deals with the lives of people who work the railway, and off-the-grid residents who depend on the railroad for supplies and access to medical facilities.

The town was most notably featured in the family classic Snow Dogs.

References

External links

 
 The Talkeetna Chamber of Commerce
 newsmatsu.com, online news for Talkeetna and the Mat-Su
 Talkeetna Historical Society 
 Denali NPS Ranger Station Talkeetna

Anchorage metropolitan area
Census-designated places in Alaska
Census-designated places in Matanuska-Susitna Borough, Alaska
Mining communities in Alaska